This is a list of international presidential trips made by Jacob Zuma while president of South Africa. Jacob Zuma began his presidency on 9 May 2009 following the African National Congress win in the 2009 South African general election and ended his tenure on 14 February 2018.

Summary of international trips

Jacob Zuma has made several foreign trips on all six continents, with several visits around Southern Africa and various multi-lateral visits around the world.

2009

2010

2011

2012

2013

2014

2015

2016

2017

2018

References 

Zuma, Jacob
Zuma
Presidential
21st century in international relations
Zuma, Jacob
Zuma